Sam Baker (Taylor, Indiana; 7 May 1907– Abilene, Kansas; 8 May 1982), born Samuel D. Baker, was an American actor who usually performed with Rudolph Valentino, Ramon Novarro, Harold Lloyd and Charlie Chaplin.

This Indiana-born actor played the Link in the film The Missing Link (1927), whose imposing presence made him a natural for early jungle flicks. His most easily recalled role may have been Hugo in Sherman S. Krellberg's notorious serial The Lost City (1935). His most memorable role was Queequeg in The Sea Beast (1926).

Baker's filmography is brief, as the sound era saw him move quickly from featured roles as African chieftains to bits as black convicts. His first screen appearance was in a genre project: he was the sworder in Douglas Fairbanks' The Thief of Bagdad (1924). In John Barrymore's  The Sea Beast, a silent Moby Dick, he played Queequeg. In the sound remake of The Island of Lost Ships (1929), he played himself and received the smallest mention.

He died in Abilene, Kansas, in early May 1982.

Filmography

References

Bibliography

External links

 

1907 births
1982 deaths
American male silent film actors
American male film actors
African-American male actors
20th-century American male actors
20th-century African-American people